In Greek mythology Nyctaea is a princess featuring in two stories about father-daughter incest, who is eventually turned into an owl by the goddess Athena. Both her tales are preserved in the works of pseudo-Lactantius Placidus, a Latin grammarian of the third century AD.

Family 
Depending on version, Nyctaea is either the daughter of Nycteus (usually a king of Thebes, but here identified as a king of the Aethiopians) or the Argive king Proetus.

Mythology

Nycteus 
In the first version, Nyctaea harboured an incestuous desire for her father, and confessed her feelings to a nurse, who helped her deceive and trick her father into bedding her by pretending to be some unrelated maiden. When Nycteus found out, he was so enraged he meant to kill Nyctaea, who implored Athena to save her. Athena took her under her protection by changing her into night owl, paralleling the story of Myrrha.

Proetus 
In another version mentioned by the same author, the Argive princess Nyctaea fled her home in terror so she could escape being raped by her father. Athena took pity in her and transformed her into a night owl, paralleling the story of Nyctimene.

See also 

 Aegypius
 Jocasta
 Byblis

References

Bibliography 
 
 Lactantius Placidus, Lactantii Placidi qui dicitur Commentarios in Statii Thebaida it Commentarium in Achilleida recensuit, translated by Ricahrd Jahnke, 1898, B. G. Tevbneri, Lipsiae.
 
 

Incestual abuse
Incest in Greek mythology
Deeds of Athena
Mythological rapists
Mythological rape victims
Metamorphoses into birds in Greek mythology
Princesses in Greek mythology